is a Japanese  former football player. He played for Tochigi Uva FC.

Playing career
Shintaro Hirai played for Sagawa Printing from 2006 to 2012. In 2013, he moved to Blaublitz Akita. In 2016, he moved to Tochigi Uva FC.

Club statistics
Updated to 20 November 2016.

References

External links

1984 births
Living people
Rissho University alumni
Japanese footballers
Japanese people of Trinidad and Tobago descent
J3 League players
Japan Football League players
SP Kyoto FC players
Blaublitz Akita players
Tochigi City FC players
Association football forwards